Distichophyllum is a genus of mosses belonging to the family Hookeriaceae.

The species of this genus are found in New Zealand.

Species:
 Distichophyllum aciphyllum Dixon, 1935 
 Distichophyllum acuminatum Bosch & Sande Lac.

References

Hookeriales
Moss genera